Einar Örn Jónsson (born 28 December 1976) is a former Icelandic handball player and current sports reporter at the Icelandic National Broadcasting Service. He competed in the 2004 Summer Olympics.

References

External links 
 
 
 
 

1976 births
Living people
Einar Orn Jonsson
Einar Orn Jonsson
Handball players at the 2004 Summer Olympics